DFS may refer to:

Brands and enterprises
 Dancer Fitzgerald Sample, advertising agency, now Saatchi & Saatchi
 DFS Furniture, a furniture retailer in the United Kingdom and Ireland
 DFS Group (Duty Free Shoppers), Hong Kong
 DFS Program Exchange, a former syndicator of TV programs
 Discover Financial Services, NYSE symbol

Organizations
 Department of Field Support, a UN department
 Department of Financial Services (disambiguation)
 Department of Financial Studies, University of Delhi, India
 Det frivillige Skyttervesen, the National Rifle Association of Norway
 Deutsche Flugsicherung, the German air traffic control organisation

 Deutsche Forschungsanstalt für Segelflug (German Research Institute for Sailplane Flight)
 Dirección Federal de Seguridad, Federal Direction of Security, Mexico
 New York State Department of Financial Services

Science and technology

Computing
 Depth-first search, an algorithm for traversing or searching tree or graph data structures
 Discrete Fourier series, the discrete version of Fourier series
 Dynamic frequency scaling, a method for reducing a microprocessor's power consumption
 Dynamic Frequency Selection, part of the IEEE 802.11h wireless standard

File systems
 Disc Filing System, a filesystem developed by Acorn Computers
 Distributed file system, a method of storing persistent data over computer network
 DCE Distributed File System (DCE/DFS), the remote file access protocol used with the Distributed Computing Environment
 Distributed File System (Microsoft), distributed SMB file shares

Other uses in science and technology
 Decoherence-free subspaces, subspace of a system's Hilbert space where the system is decoupled from the environment

 Demand Flexibility Service, a demand response system for electricity supplies in the United Kingdom 
 DFS Kopernikus (Deutscher Fernmeldesatellit Kopernikus), a series of satellites
 Digital Frequency Synthesizer, generation of different frequency from another in phase
 Disease-free survival, a measure of the efficacy of medical treatment
 Double Fourier sphere method in mathematics and geosciences

Other uses
 Daily fantasy sports, a subset of fantasy sport games
 Dumfriesshire, historic county in Scotland, Chapman code
 Dynamite Fighting Show, a Romanian-based kickboxing promotion company